Comella is a genus of moths of the family Callidulidae.

Comella may also refer to:

People
Michele Comella (1856–1926), Italian painter
Luciano Comella 1751–1812), Spanish playwright
Victor Comella Ferreres, Spanish professor
Greg Comella, American football player

Spanish-language surnames
Italian-language surnames